M58 or M-58 may refer to:

 Messier 58, a spiral galaxy in the constellation Virgo
 M58 Wolf, an armored vehicle designed to produce a smoke screen
 M58 motorway, a motorway in England
 M58 highway, a federal highway in eastern Siberia, Russian Federation
 M58 (Cape Town), a Metropolitan Route in Cape Town, South Africa
 M-58 (Michigan highway), a state highway in Michigan
 95 S 58-61, a Finnish towed anti-tank weapon
 M-58 (rocket launcher), a Swiss shoulder-fired man-portable anti-tank rocket launcher